Xak II: Rising of the Redmoon is a fantasy role-playing video game developed and published by the Japanese software developer MicroCabin. It is a direct sequel to Xak: The Art of Visual Stage (Xak I). The game was released in Japan only, but due to an MSX scene that arose in Europe (predominately in the Netherlands region) some of the MSX versions of Xak received fan translations. An enhanced remake was later released for the NEC PC-Engine, together with the first game in the series Xak as Xak I & II by Telenet Japan's development team Riot.

Setting
Xak II, being a direct sequel to the first game in the series, it features the same high fantasy setting as Xak. The gods' division of the world into Xak, the world of men, Oceanity, the world faeries, and Xexis, the world of demons, as referenced in Xak, is depicted in this game's introduction. In this adventure, the main hero of the Xak series, Latok Kart is exploring a vast region situated around a single central village of Banuwa.

Story
In Xak, the protagonist Latok Kart fought and defeated the demon Zemu Badu. One of Badu's minions escaped, a black-robed man known only as Necromancer. Three years later, Necromancer is able to contact one of his allies from the demon world of Xexis: a fearsome demon called Zamu Gospel. Following a prophecy foretold by an ancient and extremely powerful sorcerer by the name of Amadok, the Necromancer and three other demons (referred to as Demonlords) are attempting to complete a dark ritual which will revive Zamu Gospel into the world of Xak.

The player once again controls Latok, now nineteen years of age. A rumour about the whereabouts of Latok's father Dork has surfaced around the village of Banuwa. Latok and his faerie companion Pixie travel to the village to investigate, but soon run into Gospel's minions.

Characters 
Latok is the only playable character in the game.  The faerie Pixie accompanies him throughout the game and comments on Latok's actions. She is not controllable by the player, however.

Notable non-player characters Latok and Pixie meet include:
 Rune Greed, the green-haired warrior whom Latok first met during his adventures three years ago who is also a descendant of Duel, the God of War like Latok.
 Shana Tautook, a young girl who was raised by forest dwellers who plays an important role in a demonic prophecy surrounding Gospel's resurrection.
 Mune Tautook, Shana's twin sister who was captured by demons at birth and separated the Tautook family.
 Zeke Bordeaux, Banuwa's dour and tight-lipped arms dealer who has a history with Latok's father as he and Dork Kart were two of the three Legendary Fencers of Wavis.
 Fell Bow, a nun and the sister of Wavis general Nill Bow whose family's duty is to protect the White Xak Dipole and guide the descendants of Duel in their quest.
 Horn Ashtar, a bard that is traveling the world to find out what his true purpose is.
 Dr. Baspa, a doctor of Banuwa village who aids Latok on his quest and eventually presents Latok with a cure to his mother's blindness.
 Ray Deal, a captain of a ship called the Sinary who due to tragic incident lost his best friend and his entire crew.
 Freya "Fray" Jerbain, a young and outgoing sorceress whom Latok once rescued three years before. Fray is the main heroine of a Xak series spin-off, Fray In Magical Adventure and its remake, Fray CD.
 Bigoreous, the younger brother of Bogoreous, the Western demonlord.
 Bogoreous, the Western demonlord and a master of earth magic under the service of Zamu Gospel.
 Ebu Fyl, the Eastern demonlord and a master of water magic under the service of Zamu Gospel.
 Abu Baal, the Southern demonlord that has possessed the body and mind of Jerome Vordis, a person of close connection with Captain Ray Deal.  He is a master of wind magic under the service of Zamu Gospel.
 Necromancer, a powerful black-robed demon with power over the dead who is the Northern demonlord under the service of Zamu Gospel. Necromancer is a recurring villain in the series.
 Zamu Gospel, the main villain of the game and a powerful demon who was prophesied by a powerful sorcerer to be resurrected through an ancient ritual.

Gameplay
Xak II follows the same structure as its predecessor. The game proceeds by the player finding their way through labyrinthine maps, defeating opposing monsters on the way. In each map, puzzles have to be solved and keys, NPCs and other objects have to be found to gain entrance to the room where a boss dwells. After defeating the boss, the player can proceed towards the next map, where the structure repeats. Various sub-quests involving NPCs are present, most of them obligatory.

Combat is in real-time. The player's character walks around on the game maps, as well as the monster characters. Each character has an attack and defense rating. The player can have Latok swing his sword by pressing an action key and if a monster character is near enough, it will sustain damage. Monsters damage Latok by touching him or hitting him with projectiles. This combat system requires some manual dexterity, especially during boss fights—bosses are generally several times larger than Latok himself.

Presentation
On MSX2, Xak II is displayed in a screen with a 256x212 display resolution. The game uses a scrolling display, the map scrolls away as the player's character reaches a distance from the screen's side of about 1/3 of the total display. Due to the larger amount of memory available to the 256x212 display compared to the 512x212 one, the game's scrolling is markedly smoother than in Xak I.

The game's music supports both the internal PSG sound system, as well as the optional MSX-Music. In a style that is heard in most of MicroCabin's productions for MSX, the PSG channels are used for the main melody and sound effects, while the MSX-Music channels are used for supporting instruments. This prominence of the PSG is less marked than in the first game.

External links
XyZ: A Tribute to the Xak, Ys and Zelda Series 
Flame Bird

1990 video games
Action role-playing video games
Fantasy video games
FM Towns games
Japan-exclusive video games
Microcabin games
MSX2 games
NEC PC-8801 games
NEC PC-9801 games
X68000 games
Single-player video games
TurboGrafx-CD games
Video games about demons
Video games developed in Japan
Video games scored by Ryuji Sasai